Hans Hamilton (ca. 1758 – 22 December 1822) was an Anglo-Irish Member of Parliament.

Hamilton sat for Dublin County in the Irish House of Commons from 1798 until the Act of Union in 1801 and was then appointed High Sheriff of County Dublin for 1803–04. He was subsequently elected to the British House of Commons for County Dublin, a seat he held until his death in December 1822.

He was the first son of James Hamilton of Sheephill and Holmpatrick, Deputy Prothonotary of the Court of  King's Bench (Ireland), and his first wife Hannah Phillips and the grandson of James Hamilton, Member of Parliament for Newry from 1723 and Carlow Borough from 1727. 

He married Anne Mitchell and had five children. He died just before Christmas 1822, "of a most painful and tedious illness". His son James Hans Hamilton and grandson Ion Trant Hamilton also represented County Dublin in Parliament. The latter was raised to the peerage as Baron HolmPatrick in 1897. It was said that a peerage had been his grandfather's dearest wish, but his efforts to obtain one were unsuccessful; he also lobbied hard for the advancement of his relatives.

References

Kidd, Charles, Williamson, David (editors). Debrett's Peerage and Baronetage (1990 edition). New York: St Martin's Press, 1990.

1758 births
1822 deaths
Irish MPs 1798–1800
High Sheriffs of County Dublin
Members of the Parliament of Ireland (pre-1801) for County Dublin constituencies
Members of the Parliament of the United Kingdom for County Dublin constituencies (1801–1922)
UK MPs 1801–1802
UK MPs 1802–1806
UK MPs 1806–1807
UK MPs 1807–1812
UK MPs 1812–1818
UK MPs 1818–1820